Bryan P. Bergeron is an author of numerous books in the fields of medicine, computers, biotechnology, and business.  He teaches in the HST Division of Harvard Medical School and MIT and is president of Archetype Technologies, Inc.

References

External links
archetypetech.com

Massachusetts Institute of Technology faculty
Harvard Medical School faculty
Living people
Year of birth missing (living people)
Health informaticians